Helen Olivia Bicknell Whately (née Lightwood; born 23 June 1976) is a British politician serving as Minister of State for Social Care since October 2022, and previously from 2020 to 2021. She also served as Exchequer Secretary to the Treasury from 2021 to 2022. A member of the Conservative Party, she has been Member of Parliament (MP) for Faversham and Mid Kent since 2015.

Whately was appointed Deputy Chair of the Conservative Party by Theresa May in 2019, and was retained in the position by new Prime Minister Boris Johnson. She served as Parliamentary Under-Secretary of State for Arts, Heritage and Tourism from September 2019 to February 2020. In the 2020 cabinet reshuffle, Johnson moved her to the post of Minister of State for Social Care. Whately was the Social Care Minister during the COVID-19 pandemic in the United Kingdom. In the 2021 cabinet reshuffle, Johnson moved her to the post of Exchequer Secretary to the Treasury, serving under Chancellor Rishi Sunak. In July 2022, she resigned from the position in protest at Johnson's leadership amid a government crisis. She served on the backbenches during Liz Truss's tenure as Prime Minister, before returning to her former role of Social Care Minister in October 2022 under Sunak.

Early life and career
Helen Olivia Bicknell Lightwood was born in Norwich on 23 June 1976, and grew up near Redhill, Surrey. Her father was a surgeon and her mother a physician. She was educated at Woldingham School, Surrey, a day and boarding school for girls aged 11–18, before entering the sixth form at the private Westminster School in London. During her school years she undertook work experience in hospitals, with the intention of following her parents into a medical career, but Whately commented in her maiden speech as MP that it instead incentivised her to pursue a career in which she could improve healthcare as a whole.

After leaving school, she taught English in rural Nepal for a year. Lightwood read Philosophy, Politics and Economics at Lady Margaret Hall, Oxford, and was a member of debating society the Oxford Union, but she did not have any interest in student politics, later saying that she felt that it "did not seem to be about getting stuff done".

After university, she worked at PricewaterhouseCoopers for two years as a management consultant trainee, before working at AOL, where she was involved in setting up its internet film service. After this she worked as a media policy advisor for the then shadow secretary of state for culture, media and sport and Conservative MP Hugo Swire. This experience inspired her to pursue a political career. In 2008, British society magazine Tatler selected Whately as one of ten young rising stars of the Conservative Party and tipped her as a future health secretary.

She unsuccessfully contested the 2010 general election in the Kingston and Surbiton constituency for the Conservative Party, losing to the incumbent Liberal Democrat MP Ed Davey by 7,560 votes (13.3%). From 2007 to 2015, Whately worked as an engagement manager for the management consultancy firm McKinsey & Company in its healthcare division.

Parliamentary career
Whately was selected by the Conservative Party in February 2015 to contest the Faversham and Mid Kent seat in an all-women shortlist. The constituency's previous Conservative MP Hugh Robertson had chosen in January not to seek re-election. She had also made the shortlist for the Wealden, North East Hampshire, South Cambridgeshire, Bury St Edmunds and Banbury constituencies.

She was elected as MP for Faversham and Mid Kent at the 2015 general election with 24,895 votes (54%) and a majority of 16,652 (36.4%). The constituency is considered as a safe seat, and has been represented by Conservative MPs since its creation in 1997. Whately's maiden speech on 2 June focused on the National Health Service. In July, she was chosen to sit on the Commons Health Select Committee. In December, she voted to support Prime Minister David Cameron's plans to carry out airstrikes against ISIL targets in Syria.

Whately supported the United Kingdom remaining in the European Union in the 2016 membership referendum. She stated her reason for this was that British membership of the EU meant greater economic growth, security, standards of living for British people, and British influence in international affairs.

In July 2016, Whately was appointed as the parliamentary private secretary (PPS) to the international trade minister Greg Hands. In October, she was selected as the chair of the All-Party Parliamentary Group (APPG) for Mental Health and the APPG for Fruit and Vegetable Farmers. In February 2017, she voted to support the government's motion for the invoking of Article 50 to formally start the process of the UK's withdrawal from the EU. Whately, a "Remain" supporter, explained her decision as honouring the result of the referendum.

Whately held her seat at the 2017 general election, with 30,390 (61.1%) votes and an increased majority of 17,413 (35%). Following the election she became the PPS to the secretary of state for education and minister for women and equalities, Justine Greening. She also became the chair of the APPG for Health, and Personalised Medicine and continued to be chair of the APPG for Mental Health, and Fruit and Vegetable Farmers.

In July 2017, Whately was criticised for accepting several thousand pounds' worth of hospitality from the Saudi Arabian government before going on to defend its record in a parliamentary debate. The debate followed an urgent question by Liberal Democrat MP Tom Brake over fears of the imminent execution of 14 men for protest-related offences, including a number who were children at the time of their alleged offences. Whately had urged parliamentarians to "appreciate that the government of Saudi Arabia are taking to steps to improve their actions on human rights", but was criticised by an opposition Labour Party MP as a "serial apologist for the regime".

In January 2018, she was appointed as PPS to Brandon Lewis, the minister without portfolio and Conservative Party chair. Later in the year, she became Vice Chair of the Conservative Party for Women, after Maria Caulfield stood down in protest at the Government's approach to Brexit.

In 2019, Whately voted for the then prime minister Theresa May's Brexit withdrawal agreement. She also stated her opposition to a referendum on any Brexit withdrawal agreement. On 17 April, Whately was promoted to Deputy Chair of the Conservative Party. On 10 September, she was appointed as Parliamentary Under-Secretary of State for Arts, Heritage and Tourism by Prime Minister Boris Johnson. At the December general election, she was re-elected with an increased majority of 21,976 (43.6%).

In February 2020, Whatley joined the Department for Health and Social Care as the minister of state for social care.

Whately was appointed Exchequer Secretary to the Treasury in the 2021 cabinet reshuffle. She resigned on the morning of 7 July 2022 as part of a series of mass resignations against Prime Minister Boris Johnson.

On 23 February 2023, Whately was reselected as the Conservative candidate for Faversham and Mid Kent at the next general election.

Campaigns
Whately campaigned with the Kent County Council for two new schools to be opened in Maidstone, Kent, to relieve pressure on primary school places, as well as offering more places for children with special needs. This resulted in the opening of Maidstone Primary Academy and the secondary special school, Bearsted Academy.

She campaigned against Maidstone's Local Plan (a policy document that defines the framework for development in the area until 2031) as she felt that it did not have enough funding for improvements in infrastructure and roads and could damage local landmarks such as Leeds Castle. Both Whately and Maidstone and The Weald MP Helen Grant wrote to the then secretary of state for communities and local government Sajid Javid in September 2017 to intervene in the matter, but he declined as he felt that it was a decision that should be made locally. Maidstone Borough Council formally adopted the Local Plan in October.

Personal life
Whately lives in London and in a village near Faversham. She has been married to Marcus Whately (whom she met at the University of Oxford) since 2005, who is the founder and co-chief executive officer of an energy company. They have three children. She has one older brother. Since 2015, she has been a vice-president of the Maidstone branch of the learning disability charity Mencap.

As a horse rider she was a member of the British Junior Eventing Squad, and at university she was captain of the riding team and won two half-blues.

References

External links

1976 births
Living people
Alumni of Lady Margaret Hall, Oxford
People educated at Westminster School, London
Politicians from Norwich
People from Redhill, Surrey
People from Faversham
Conservative Party (UK) MPs for English constituencies
Female members of the Parliament of the United Kingdom for English constituencies
UK MPs 2015–2017
UK MPs 2017–2019
UK MPs 2019–present
21st-century British women politicians
21st-century English women
21st-century English people